Pokrovsky, also spelled Pokrovski and Pokrovskii, or Pokrovskaya (feminine; Покровская) is a Slavic last name. Its form in neuter is Pokrovskoye.  It may refer to:

People 
Alexander Pokrovsky (1898–1979), Soviet military leader
Anatoly Pokrovsky (1930–2022), Russian vascular surgeon
Boris Pokrovsky (1912–2009), former chief director of the Bolshoi Theater and founder of the Moscow Chamber Opera Theater
Dmitri Pokrovsky (1944–1996), Russian musician
Georgy Pokrovsky (1901–1979), Soviet physicist
Igor Pokrovsky (1926–2002), Soviet architect
Ksenia Pokrovsky (1942–2013), Russian-American icon painter
Konstantin Pokrovsky (1868–1944), Russian and Ukrainian astronomer
Mikhail Nikolayevich Pokrovsky (1868–1932), Soviet historian and academic
Mikhail Pokrovsky (linguist) (1869–1942), Russian/Soviet linguist, literary critic, and academic
Nikolai Pokrovsky (1865–1930), last foreign minister of the Russian Empire
Nikolai Pokrovsky (actor) (1896–1961), Soviet actor, theater director, and People's Artist of the USSR
Valery Pokrovsky (born 1931), Russian physicist
Victor Pokrovsky (1897–1990), Russian choir director, translator, and music arranger
Viktor Pokrovsky (1889–1922), Russian lieutenant general
Vladimir Pokrovsky (architect) (1871–1931?), Russian architect
Vladimir Pokrovsky (pilot) (1918–1998), Soviet aircraft pilot and Hero of the Soviet Union

Places 
Pokrovsky District, a district of Oryol Oblast, Russia
Pokrovsky, Russia (Pokrovskaya, Pokrovskoye), name of several inhabited localities in Russia
Pokrovskoye, former name of the village of Qaratəpə, Azerbaijan

Other 
Pokrovsky Cathedral, also known as the Cathedral of St. Basil the Blessed, in Red Square, Moscow
Pokrovsky Monastery (Moscow), a male monastery in Moscow, Russia
Pokrovsky Monastery (Suzdal), a female monastery in Suzdal, Russia
The Pokrovsky Gate, a 1982 Soviet comedy film

See also
Pokrovsk
Novopokrovsky
Pokrovka (disambiguation)
Arbatsko-Pokrovskaya line, one of the lines of the Moscow Metro